This page details the match results and statistics of the Argentina national football team from 1980 to 1999.

Key

Key to matches
Att.=Match attendance
(H)=Home ground
(A)=Away ground
(N)=Neutral ground

Key to record by opponent
Pld=Games played
W=Games won
D=Games drawn
L=Games lost
GF=Goals for
GA=Goals against

Results
Argentina's score is shown first in each case.

Notes

Record by opponent

References

Argentina national football team results